Victoria Hill is a locality spit between the Southern Downs Region and the Toowoomba Region, both in Queensland, Australia.

History 
Victoria Hill State School opened in July 1911. It closed on 31 December 1963.

The Victoria Hill Hall was officially opened on Saturday 13 September 1930 by William Deacon, the Member of the Queensland Legislative Assembly for Cunningham. A sports afternoon and ball were held to celebrate the opening.

Amenities 
The Victoria Hill branch of the Queensland Country Women's Association meets at the Victoria Hill Hall on Dalrymple  Creek Road.

Education 
There are no schools in Victoria Hill. The nearest primary schools are in Allora, Clifton, Back Plains and Wheatvale. The nearest secondary schools are in Allora (but only to Year 10) and Clifton (through Year 12).

References 

Southern Downs Region
Toowoomba Region
Localities in Queensland